The 1994 Columbia Lions football team was an American football team that represented Columbia University during the 1994 NCAA Division I-AA football season. Columbia tied for fourth in the Ivy League.

In their sixth season under head coach Ray Tellier, the Lions compiled a 5–4–1 record and outscored opponents 240 to 230. Brian Bassett and Jamie Schwalbe were the team captains.

The Lions' 3–4 conference record placed them in a three-way tie for fourth in the Ivy League standings. Columbia was outscored 176 to 160 by Ivy opponents.

Columbia played its homes games at Lawrence A. Wien Stadium in Upper Manhattan, in New York City.

Schedule

References

Columbia
Columbia Lions football seasons
Columbia Lions football